Carballeda de Avia is a municipality in the Province of Ourense in the Galicia region of north-west Spain. As of 2012 it had a population of 1487 people. River valleys in the municipality include the Miño, Avia, Arnoia and Barbantiño.

Parishes 
Abelenda das Penas (Santo André)
Balde (San Martiño)
Beiro (San Pedro)
Carballeda (San Miguel)
Faramontaos (San Cosmede)
Muimenta (San Xiao)
Santo Estevo de Nóvoa (Santo Estevo)
Vilar de Condes (Santa María)

References

External links
Official website

Municipalities in the Province of Ourense